This is a list of films which have placed number one at the box office in Australia during 2012. All amounts are in Australian dollars.

Notes
A  One night screening at selected cinemas of digitally remastered and enhanced versions of two first-season episodes of Star Trek: The Next Generation ("Where No One Has Gone Before" and "Datalore") to celebrate the release of Season 1 on Blu-ray.
B  A biennial event showcasing anime films for two weeks, held by Madman Entertainment in cinemas in capital cities across the country. The films are screened in their native Japanese with English subtitles. In 2012, the films were: From Up on Poppy Hill, Wolf Children, Berserk Golden Age Arc I: The Egg of the King, and Children Who Chase Lost Voices.

References
Urban Cinefile – Box Office

See also
List of Australian films – Australian films by year
2012 in film

2012
Australia
2012 in Australian cinema